This article presents the discography of Swedish recording band Broder Daniel. Included are four studio albums, three compilation albums, fifteen singles and three soundtracks.

Their debut album was Saturday Night Engine in 1995.

They've been signed with EMI and then later Dolores Recordings.

Studio albums

Saturday Night Engine 

Debut album. Released 21 April 1995.

Broder Daniel 

Second studio album. Released 22 April 1996. One year and one day after the release of their debut album.

Broder Daniel Forever 

Third studio album. Released 22 April 1998. Two years after their second studio album.

Cruel Town 

Released 2003.

Compilation albums

Singles

No Time For Us (1989–2004)

Singles

Singles

Video albums

Music videos

Soundtracks

References

External links 
 
 

Discographies of Swedish artists
Pop music group discographies